Geneviève Robic Brunet (born 13 April 1959) is a retired road racing cyclist from Canada. Genny was twice National Road Champion in 1984 and 1987, and twice National Criterium Champion those same years. She represented Canada at two consecutive Summer Olympics, starting in 1984. Training in New Mexico and then Colorado, Genny Brunet, resident of Pierrefonds, Quebec, ended up in 22nd place (Los Angeles Olympics 1984) and 4th place (Seoul Olympics 1988) in the Women's Individual Road Race. Her early retirement from cycling followed a training accident from which she could not fully recover.

References

External links
 Canadian Olympic Committee
 
 

1959 births
Living people
Canadian female cyclists
Cyclists at the 1984 Summer Olympics
Cyclists at the 1988 Summer Olympics
Olympic cyclists of Canada
Cyclists from Montreal
People from Pierrefonds-Roxboro